Jordan Lam Lok Kan (born 2 February 1999 in Hong Kong) is a Hong Kong professional footballer who currently plays for Hong Kong Premier League club Resources Capital.

Youth career
Born in Hong Kong, Lam's family moved to Temple City, California when he was several months old. Due to his father's need to frequently travel between Hong Kong and Los Angeles for work, the family decided to sell their house in Temple City and move back to Hong Kong after a few years.

When Lam was seven, he and his brother entered and won a 2 on 2 football tournament organized by the local YMCA. At age 10, he joined a football academy run by Hong Kong football star Leslie Santos, which would later become Chelsea Soccer School. During his time at Chelsea Soccer School, he trained under the tutelage of Shum Kwok Pui, competed in various Hong Kong youth tournaments and many overseas showcase tournaments.

In 2014, Lam led Diocesan Boys' School to the Hong Kong Inter-School Football Competition championship and was named season MVP. His performances soon attracted the attention of scouts and he was offered opportunities to join the youth teams of Guangzhou Evergrande and Shandong Luneng. However, his family did not want to relocate to the Mainland as they felt that the standard of players whom Lam would train against were similar to those in Hong Kong.

On 21 June 2015, Lam led the South China U-16 team to a victory over the Kitchee U-16's in the HKFA U-16 Cup  Final. Eastern expressed an interest in signing Lam to a professional contract following the match but ultimately were unable to come to terms.

In March 2016, Lam and his Chelsea School teammate Tse Ka Wing travelled to England to seek out an opportunity to join the youth academy of an English side. The two trialled at Leicester City but left because they felt that it would be too difficult to break into the first team. The two later trialled at Bury for six weeks and decided to join their academy. However, their time at Bury was marred by a delay in the processing of their international clearance. As a result, the pair could not receive work permits in order to play in the Football League Youth Alliance with the rest of the squad. Facing long odds of ever receiving a work permit, Lam returned to Hong Kong.

Professional career

Pegasus
On 10 February 2017, Lam signed his first professional contract with Pegasus. He made his debut on 1 April, creating two assists in a 5–3 loss to Eastern.

On 12 June 2018, Lam stated that he would leave Pegasus in search of greater playing opportunities elsewhere.

Dreams FC
Following his departure, Lam joined Dreams FC on 11 July 2018.

R&F
On 19 June 2019, R&F head coach Yeung Ching Kwong revealed that Lam would join the club. He was officially announced as an R&F player on 9 July 2019.

During preseason training in Portugal, Lam injured his anterior cruciate ligament, necessitating a long layoff to recover. On 14 October 2020, Lam left the club after his club's withdrawal from the HKPL in the new season.

Southern
On 25 November 2020, Lam signed for Southern.

Resources Capital
On 21 August 2021, Lam joined Resources Capital.

International career
In October 2014, Lam received his first call up to the Hong Kong U-16's as a 15 year old. Head coach Yeung Ching Kwong selected him ahead of the 2014 AFC U-16 Championship despite being a year younger than some of his teammates. He made two appearances off the bench for Hong Kong but the team did not advance past the group stage.

In May 2017, Lam was called into the Hong Kong U-23's squad which finished as runners up in the HKFC Soccer Sevens tournament. In July 2017, he was called into the full squad for U-23's squad for a tournament in Myanmar and 2018 AFC U-23 Championship qualification.

Personal life
Lam's younger brother, Jerry, is also a professional footballer who is currently playing for Eastern.

References

External links
 
 Jordan Lam at HKFA
 

1999 births
Living people
Hong Kong people
Hong Kong footballers
TSW Pegasus FC players
Dreams Sports Club players
R&F (Hong Kong) players
Southern District FC players
Resources Capital FC players
Hong Kong Premier League players
Association football midfielders